Xhonatan Isufi (born 8 April 2000), known professionally as Don Xhoni, is a Kosovo-Albanian rapper.

Life and career

2000–present: Early life and career beginnings 

Don Xhoni was born as Xhonatan Isufi on 8 April 2000 into an Albanian family in the village of Çikatovë e Re near Drenas, Kosovo. After rosing to prominence, Isufi was featured on Albanian singer Enca's "Break Down" in July 2020. The song attained commercial success in Albania, reaching number 11 on the country's Top 100 chart. He further gained international recognition in late 2020, after his single, "Make a pose (Freestyle)", turned viral on the social media platform TikTok. Isufi's chart success ensued into October 2021 with the single, "Trust me", which peaked at number 13 in Albania and number 72 in Switzerland. By November 2021, his collaboration with Swiss-Albanian rapper Loredana on his follow-up "Gjuj për to" had reached the top five in Albania and number 32 in Swiss Singles Top 100 chart. A month later, he was featured on Kosovo-Albanian singer Butrint Imeri's successful single "Corazon" in December 2021.

Discography

Singles

As lead artist

As featured artist

References 

2000 births
21st-century Albanian rappers
Albanian hip hop singers
Albanian-language singers
Albanian songwriters
Kosovan people of Albanian descent
Kosovan rappers
Living people
People from Drenas